Glaciar Norte was a glacier located on the volcanic peak of Popocatépetl in the Mexican State of Puebla. Glaciar Norte is connected to Glaciar del Ventorrillo, which lies to the west. In a study published in 2006, all the glaciers atop Popocatépetl had essentially disappeared due to increased volcanic activity. In the 1990s, the glaciers greatly decreased in size, partly due to warmer temperatures but largely due to increased volcanic activity. By early 2001, Popocatepetl's glaciers had become extinct; ice remained on the volcano, but no longer displayed the characteristic features of glaciers such as crevasses.

Retreating
Glacier retreating

See also 
List of glaciers in Mexico

References 

Landforms of Puebla
Glaciers of Mexico